The Grubel–Lloyd index measures intra-industry trade of a particular product. It was introduced by Herb Grubel and Peter Lloyd in 1971.

where Xi denotes the export, Mi the import of good i.

If GLi = 1, there is a good level of intra-industry trade. This means for example the Country in consideration Exports the same quantity of good i as much as it Imports. Conversely, if GLi = 0, there is no intra-industry trade at all. This would mean that the Country in consideration only either Exports or only Imports good i.

References

International trade theory